Combs-la-Ville is a commune in the south-eastern suburbs of Paris, in the Seine-et-Marne department in the Île-de-France in north-central France.

Demographics
The inhabitants are called Combs-la-Villais.

Transportation
Combs-la-Ville is served by Combs-la-Ville – Quincy station on Paris RER line D.

Twin towns
Combs-la-Ville is twinned with the towns of :

Duderstadt in Germany since 1968
Dali in Cyprus since 1978
Oswestry in the United Kingdom since 1980
R' Kiz in Mauritania since 1986
Petite-Île in Réunion (an overseas department of France in the Indian Ocean) since 1992
Salaberry-de-Valleyfield in Quebec, Canada since 1998
Baia Mare in Romania since September 5, 2009.

See also
Communes of the Seine-et-Marne department

References

External links

Official website 
1999 Land Use, from IAURIF (Institute for Urban Planning and Development of the Paris-Île-de-France région) 
 

Communes of Seine-et-Marne
Sénart